Graham Raymond Hobbins (born 27 February 1946) is a former English cricketer.  Hobbins was a right-handed batsman who bowled right-arm fast-medium.  He was born in Eastbourne, Sussex, but his family moved to Rhodesia in 1947 where he attended Umtali Boys High School.

Hobbins moved back to the UK in 1964, and made his debut for Oxfordshire in the 1972 Minor Counties Championship against Dorset.  Hobbins played Minor counties cricket for Oxfordshire from 1972 to 1986, which included 36 Minor Counties Championship matches and 7 MCCA Knockout Trophy matches.  He made his List A debut against Gloucestershire in the 1972 Gillette Cup.  He played 3 further List A matches, the last coming against Worcestershire in the 1986 NatWest Trophy.  In his 4 List A matches, he scored 36 runs at a batting average of 12.00, with a high score of 15.  With the ball, he took 3 wickets at a bowling average of 49.66, with best figures of 2/57.

References

External links
Graham Hobbins at ESPNcricinfo
Graham Hobbins at CricketArchive

1946 births
Living people
Sportspeople from Eastbourne
English cricketers
Oxfordshire cricketers